Clough can refer to the following:

Places

 Clough, County Laois, Ireland, a village 
 Clough, a village in County Down, Northern Ireland
 Clough, South Dakota, a ghost town
 Boggart Hole Clough, parkland in Manchester, England 
 Clough Castle, a motte-and-bailey in the village of Clough, Northern Ireland 
 Clough Dene, a village in County Durham, England
 Clough Hall, a suburb of Kidsgrove, Staffordshire, England 
 Clough Head, a fell in England's Lake District 
 Clough River, Cumbria, England 
 Clough Undergraduate Learning Commons, a building of Georgia Tech university, United States

People

First / middle name

 Clough Williams-Ellis
 John Clough Holmes
 Richard Clough Anderson, Jr.

Surname

 Anne Clough (1820 - 1892), British college principal and suffragist
 Arthur Hugh Clough (1819 - 1861), English poet
 Blanche Athena Clough (1861-1960), British college principal and classicist
 Brenda Clough, American science fiction writer
 Brian Clough (1935 - 2004), English football player and manager
 Bryan Clough (1932 - ), English writer
 Charles Sidney Clough (born 1951), American painter
 Charles Thomas Clough (1852–1916), British geologist and mapmaker
 David Marston Clough (1846 - 1924), American politician
 Ethlyn T. Clough (1858–1936), American newspaper publisher, editor
 Gareth Clough (1978 - ), English cricketer
 G. Wayne Clough (1941 - ), engineer, Secretary of the Smithsonian Institution and former President of the Georgia Institute of Technology
 Ian Clough (1937 - 1970), British mountaineer
 Jack Clough, British football referee
 John Clough (1984 - ), English rugby league player
 Joseph Messer Clough (1828 - 1919), American Union Civil War era brevet brigadier general
 Nigel Clough (1966 - ), English footballer and manager (son of Brian Clough)
 Paul Clough (1987 - ), English rugby league player
 Peter Clough (1956 - ), Australian cricketer
 Prunella Clough (1919 - 1999), British artist
 Ray W. Clough (1920 - ), Professor at UC Berkeley
 Richard Clough (c.1530 - 1570), Welsh merchant
 Sharyn Clough (1965 - ), American philosopher
 Tom Clough (1891 - 1964), English musician
 Zach Clough (1995 - ), English footballer

Other
 Clough, name for a steep-sided valley in Northern England, e.g. Lancashire (Cleugh is the local form in Northumberland, Durham, and Cumberland)
 Clough/Ballacolla, sports club
 Clough Harbour, a United States engineering firm
 Clough Group, an Australian engineering firm

See also
Clogh (disambiguation)